Hugues Obry (born 19 May 1973) is a retired French fencer and current coach. He won a gold medal in team épée at the 2004 Summer Olympics in Athens, together with Érik Boisse, Fabrice Jeannet and Jérôme Jeannet. He won two silver medals at the 2000 Summer Olympics in Sydney.

Following his victory at the 2004 Olympic Games in Athens, he was made a chevalier of the Légion d'honneur.

Obry became assistant coach of the French men's épée team in 2008, and head coach from 2012 to 2016. He is also technical director of the Levallois Sporting Club.

Obry now coaches the Chinese Épée team.

References

External links

1973 births
Living people
French male épée fencers
Olympic fencers of France
Olympic gold medalists for France
Olympic silver medalists for France
Fencers at the 2000 Summer Olympics
Fencers at the 2004 Summer Olympics
Olympic medalists in fencing
Medalists at the 2000 Summer Olympics
Medalists at the 2004 Summer Olympics
Chevaliers of the Légion d'honneur